is a Japanese cel-shaded computer-animated television series, based on the novel Ronia, the Robber's Daughter (Ronja Rövardotter) written by Astrid Lindgren. Produced by Polygon Pictures, Studio Ghibli, NHK Enterprises and Dwango, the series is directed and storyboarded by Gorō Miyazaki, with Hiroyuki Kawasaki handling series composition and writing the scripts, Katsuya Kondō designing the characters, Toshio Suzuki providing the title logo and Satoshi Takebe composing the music. Miyazaki stated, "Ronja, the Robber's Daughter is not only a story about a young girl growing into adulthood, but also a story of love, growth, and the bond between parent and child and their friends. We aim to create a story that can be enjoyed by everyone, from children to adults." Kazuyoshi Saito wrote, produced and performed all the instruments on "Player" for Mari Natsuki to sing as the ending theme song. It is Studio Ghibli's first television series.

UK-based distributor Serious Lunch has acquired the worldwide distribution rights, except for Japan and Scandinavia. It sought English-language broadcasters and brought the series to potential backers at the 2015 Annecy International Animated Film Festival. Amazon began streaming the series on its Amazon Prime streaming service on January 27, 2017. GKIDS released the series in the United States on August 20, 2019 (distributed by Shout! Factory), and additional licenses were sold in China (UYoung Media) and Taiwan (PTS). The English dub is narrated by Gillian Anderson.

Storyline
Ronja, the only child of a bandit chief, grows up among a clan of robbers living in a castle in the woodlands of early-Medieval Scandinavia. When Ronja grows old enough she ventures into the forest, exploring and discovering its wonders and dangers like the mystical creatures that dwell there. She learns to live in the forest through her own strength, with the occasional rescue by her parents. Ronja's life begins to change, however, when she happens upon a boy her own age named Birk, who turns out to be the son of the rival clan chief.

Characters
 
 
 
  aka Birk Borkason

Episode list

Reception

Critical reception of Sanzoku no Musume Rōnya was mostly positive. The series was praised in reviews by The Guardian, Collider The Daily Dot, Slate, iDigitalTimes, Starburst, Mir Fantastiki, among others. Meanwhile, Swedish journalist Yukiko Duke, The Onion's The A.V. Club and Polygon published negative reviews. The show was praised for its visual beauty and being faithful to the original novel, but criticized for slow pacing.

Awards

|-
| 2015
| rowspan=2|Ronja, The Robber’s Daughter
| Asian Television Awards  — Best 2D Animated Programme 
| 
|-
| 2016
| International Emmy Awards — Kids: Animation 
| 
|-
|}

References

External links

Official site 
Polygon Pictures site

2014 anime television series debuts
2015 Japanese television series endings
Fantasy anime and manga
NHK original programming
Animated series based on novels
Japanese children's animated fantasy television series
Polygon Pictures
Television shows based on children's books
Japanese computer-animated television series
Television series about families
Theft in fiction
Television shows based on works by Astrid Lindgren